Chiloglottis turfosa, commonly known as the bog bird orchid, is a species of orchid endemic to southern New South Wales and the Australian Capital Territory. It has two dark green leaves and a single greenish to reddish brown flower with a shiny dark reddish callus of mostly thin, column-like glands on the labellum.

Description
Flowering occurs from November to December.

Taxonomy and naming
Chiloglottis turfosa was first formally described in 1991 by David Jones from a specimen collected near the Tantangara Dam and the description was published in Australian Orchid Research. The specific epithet (turfosa) is a Latin word meaning "a peat bog" referring to the habitat of this orchid.

Distribution and habitat
The bog bird orchid grows with grasses and under shrubs in peaty soil in the Snowy Mountains near Kiandra and Adaminaby and in the Australian Capital Territory.

References

External links 

turfosa
Orchids of New South Wales
Orchids of the Australian Capital Territory
Plants described in 1991